Joshua Gage (August 7, 1763 – January 24, 1831) was a U.S. Representative from Massachusetts.   Born in Harwich, Massachusetts, Gage completed preparatory studies.  In 1795, he moved to Augusta (then a part of Massachusetts' District of Maine).  He was a master mariner, and subsequently became engaged in mercantile pursuits.  Gage was the Chairman of the Augusta, Massachusetts, Board of Selectmen, in 1803.  He served as member of the Massachusetts House of Representatives, and served in the Massachusetts State Senate.  He also served as Treasurer of Kennebec County from 1810 to 1831.

Gage was elected as a Democratic-Republican to the Fifteenth Congress (March 4, 1817 – March 3, 1819).   After leaving the House Gage served as member of the Executive Council of Maine in Governor Parris' administration. Gage died in Augusta on January 24, 1831.

Sources

Notes

 

1763 births
1831 deaths
Massachusetts state senators
Members of the Massachusetts House of Representatives
People from Harwich, Massachusetts
Massachusetts Democratic-Republicans
Politicians from Augusta, Maine
Members of the Executive Council of Maine
Democratic-Republican Party members of the United States House of Representatives from the District of Maine
Members of the United States House of Representatives from Massachusetts